Firoza Begum was a Jewish Indian actress.  Firoza starred in several Bollywood and Mollywood films.  She was "hugely" popular in the 1920s and 1930s. Although there were many Jewish actresses at the time, she stands out along with other notables like Ruby Myers and Esther Victoria Abraham (Pramila).

She is of Bene Israel heritage. Born Susan Solomon, she used the Muslim name Firoza Begum to hide her Jewish ancestry
(see History of the Jews in India). She was one of five famous Jewish Indian actresses featured in the documentary Shalom Bollywood: The Untold Story of Jews and Bollywood by Danny Ben-Moshe released in 2013.

Filmography
 Bewafa Qatil
 Prem Veer
 Din Raat
 Raigad
 Bhagta Bhoot
 Circus Girl
 Noor-E-Yaman (1935)
 Ansuon Ki Duniya (1936)
 Bharat Ka Lal (1936)

References

Bene Israel
Malayali people
Actresses from Kerala
Indian film actresses
Year of birth unknown
Year of death unknown
Jewish actresses
20th-century Indian actresses
Actresses in Malayalam cinema
Actresses in Hindi cinema
Indian silent film actresses
Indian Jews